Too Vaega (born 17 August 1965 in Motootua, Samoa) is a retired professional rugby union footballer, best known for his long career with the Samoan national team.

Career
Vaega made his debut for Samoa against Wales on 14 June 1986, starting one of the longest international careers in modern rugby union history. By the time of his final cap against Ireland on 11 November 2001, he had represented his country 61 times in a 15-year period.

Vaega starred for Samoa in three World Cups, but is most remembered for scoring a critical try in Samoa's historic 16–13 victory over Wales in Cardiff during the 1991 Rugby World Cup.

Outside of his duties with the Samoan national team, Vaega enjoyed a long club career in New Zealand, most notably with Southland and the Highlanders in the mid-1990s. He was an original Highlander in the first Super 12 campaign in 1996, and set a franchise record with three tries in a match that year against Western Province, a record he shares to this day.

Vaega's son Cardiff Vaega, named for the site of Samoa's victory over Wales in 1991, is currently playing for the Counties-Manukau Steelers in the Mitre 10 Cup competition.

References

External links
 Mastercard commercial featuring Vaega
 
To'o M. V. Vaega at New Zealand Rugby History

1965 births
Living people
Samoan rugby union players
Samoa international rugby union players
Highlanders (rugby union) players
Blues (Super Rugby) players
Samoan expatriate rugby union players
Expatriate rugby union players in New Zealand
Samoan expatriate sportspeople in New Zealand
Rugby union centres